HMS Triumph was a 42-gun great ship or second rate of the English Royal Navy, built by William Burrell at Deptford Royal Dockyard and launched in 1623. Like many major warships in the 17th century, she was modified at various times during her life, so that her dimensions and tonnage grew during her 65 years of service. By 1660 her original armament had been increased to 64 guns and by 1666 to 72 guns.

Triumph was sold out of the navy in 1688.

Notes

References

Lavery, Brian (2003) The Ship of the Line - Volume 1: The development of the battlefleet 1650-1850. Conway Maritime Press. .
Winfield, Rif (2009) British Warships in the Age of Sail: 1603 - 1714. Seaforth Publishing.

Ships of the line of the Royal Navy
Ships built in Deptford
1620s ships